The Organic Law of the People's Courts of the People's Republic of China is the organic law for the people's courts in China.  It was passed in 1954 for the first time.  After the Cultural Revolution, this law was re-passed by the Fifth National People's Congress on July 1, 1979, and amended by the Standing Committee of the National People's Congress on September 2, 1983.

This law has three chapters and 41 articles.  It prescribes that the Chinese courts include the Supreme People's Court, local people's courts, and other special courts.

External links
Text of the law

Laws of China
1954 in law
1954 in China
Judiciary of China